Minonk Township is located in Woodford County in Illinois at T28N, R2E. It includes within its boundaries the city of Minonk, Illinois. As of the 2010 census, its population was 2,292 and it contained 998 housing units. Minonk Township and Panola Township (T27N, R2E) were originally the same township, but were separated on an unknown date.

Geography

Demographics

References

External links
City-data.com
Illinois State Archives

Townships in Woodford County, Illinois
Townships in Illinois